Williamstown is the primary village and a census-designated place (CDP) in the town of Williamstown, Orange County, Vermont, United States. As of the 2020 census, it had a population of 1,264, out of 3,515 in the entire town of Williamstown.

The CDP is in northwestern Orange County, in the north-central part of the town of Williamstown. It is in the valley of the Stevens Branch of the Winooski River, part of the Lake Champlain watershed. Vermont Route 14 passes through the village center, leading north  to Barre and south through Williamstown Gulf  to South Royalton in the White River Valley. Vermont Route 64 leads west from Williamstown village  to Interstate 89.

References 

Populated places in Orange County, Vermont
Census-designated places in Orange County, Vermont
Census-designated places in Vermont